John Hardin may refer to:

 John Hardin (1753–1792), Continental Army officer in the American Revolutionary War
 John J. Hardin (1810–1847), U.S. Representative from Illinois
 John Wesley Hardin (1853–1895), outlaw and gunfighter of the American Old West

See also
 John Hardin High School named after the Continental Army officer
John Harding (disambiguation)